Danilovsky District is an administrative and municipal district (raion), one of the seventeen in Yaroslavl Oblast, Russia. It is located in the northeast of the oblast. Its administrative center is the town of Danilov. Population: 26,072 (2010 Census);  The population of Danilov accounts for 60.8% of the district's total population.

References

Notes

Sources

Districts of Yaroslavl Oblast